Batsu may refer to:

 The Japanese name for the symbol "×", kanji 罰, meaning "wrong", as in a wrong answer or used to indicated a censored word
 A gesture in Japanese culture
 Batsu game, a penalty game in a Japanese stage show
 Batsu Ichimonji, a character from the Rival Schools video game series
 Persona 2: Innocent Sin, an RPG for PlayStation
 Persona 2: Eternal Punishment, an RPG for PlayStation
 Bats & Terry or Batsu & Teri, a Japanese manga series, film and game